Yong-soo Park (born 1981) is a South Korean taekwondo practitioner and heavyweight kickboxer who has fought professionally in K-1.

His most notable opponents include Kaoklai Kaennorsing, Musashi, and Jerome Le Banner.

Career
In December 2012, Park signed with the Glory promotion.

He was scheduled to fight Singh Jaideep at Glory 5: London on March 23, 2013 in London, England but was replaced by Daniel Sam.

Park made his Glory debut at Glory 20: Dubai on April 3, 2015, facing Chi Lewis-Parry. He was knocked out just 25 seconds into the first round.

Kickboxing record

|-  bgcolor="#FFBBBB"
| 2015-04-03 || Loss ||align=left| Chi Lewis Parry || Glory 20: Dubai || Dubai, UAE || KO || 1 || 0:25
|-  bgcolor="#FFBBBB"
| 2013-02-02 || Loss ||align=left| Yin Pengsen || The Khan vs. Wulinfeng || Seoul, Republic of Korea || TKO (Referee-Stoppage) || 3 || 2:38
|-  bgcolor="CCFFCC"
| 2012-01-15 || Win ||align=left| Yoo Yang-rae || The Khan 3 || Republic of Korea || KO || 1 || 0:42 
|-  bgcolor="#FFBBBB"
| 2009-08-02 || Loss ||align=left| Singh Jaideep || K-1 World Grand Prix 2009 in Seoul || Seoul, Republic of Korea || KO (Right hook) || 2 || 1:35
|-  bgcolor="#FFBBBB"
| 2009-05-23 || Loss ||align=left| Martin Rozalski || K-1 World Grand Prix 2009 in Lodz || Lodz, Poland || KO || 3 || 0:32
|-  bgcolor="#FFBBBB"
| 2008-09-27 || Loss||align=left| Randy Kim || K-1 World Grand Prix 2008 Final Elimination || Seoul, Republic of Korea || KO || 2  || 1:11
|-  bgcolor="#FFBBBB"
| 2008-07-13 || Loss||align=left| Makoto Uehara || K-1 World Grand Prix 2008 in Taipei || Taipei, Taiwan || KO (Left Hook) || Ex. R  || 1:26
|-  bgcolor="#FFBBBB"
| 2007-09-29 || Loss ||align=left| Jerome Le Banner || K-1 World GP 2007 in Seoul Final 16 || Seoul, Korea || KO (Right punch) || 1 || 0:54 
|-
|-  bgcolor="#FFBBBB"
| 2007-08-05 || Loss ||align=left| Musashi || K-1 World Grand Prix 2007 in Hong Kong Quarter Finals || Hong Kong || KO (Left Hook) || 2 || 0:48 
|-
|-  bgcolor="#FFBBBB"
| 2007-02-18 || Loss ||align=left| Kaoklai Kaennorsing || K-1 Fighting Network KHAN 2007 in Seoul || Seoul, South Korea || Decision (Unanimous) || 4(Ex.1) || 3:00
|-  bgcolor="CCFFCC"
| 2006-10-14 || Win ||align=left| Paul Lungruff || K-1 Rules African Bomba-Yaa || Johannesburg, South Africa  || Decision || 3 || 3:00 
|-  bgcolor="CCFFCC"
| 2006-09-16 || Win ||align=left| Daisuke Watanabe || K-1 Khan 2006 in Seoul || Seoul, South Korea || KO (Left High Kick) || 1 || 1:16 
|-  bgcolor="CCFFCC"
| 2006-06-03 || Win ||align=left| Rikijyo || K-1 World Grand Prix 2006 in Seoul || Seoul, South Korea || KO || 1 || 2:21
|-
| colspan=9 | Legend:

References

 http://www.fansofk1.com/fighter?fID=125

Living people
Heavyweight kickboxers 
South Korean male taekwondo practitioners
South Korean male kickboxers
Glory kickboxers
1981 births
21st-century South Korean people